Harmil is an uninhabited island in Eritrea that forms part of the Dahlak Archipelago. The inhabitants are serving members of the Eritrean Navy who have a small outpost on the island. The outpost consists of a series of traditional African circular huts and other buildings constructed from timber and other materials found on the island's beaches.

The Eritrea Navy operates the outpost to observe the nearby waters for unwanted foreign visitors or vessels. They carry out patrols in the waters surrounding the island using dhows and skiffs. The forces personnel on the island spend 4–6 months on the island with the only contact with the outside world being via medium frequency radio to their headquarters just south of Massawa over 60 miles away.

The island itself is a desert-like environment with very little vegetation; however, the forces there do maintain herds of cows and goats. Due to the very low lay of the land, the winds blowing across the islands can be severe.

See also
List of islands of Africa

Dahlak Archipelago
Islands of Eritrea
Islands of the Red Sea
Uninhabited islands